Grove Park may refer to:

United Kingdom

London

Districts 
Grove Park, Hounslow
Grove Park, Lewisham
Grove Park Cemetery
Grove Park railway station
Grove Park Sidings

Parks 
Grove Park (Sutton), a park

Elsewhere
Grove Park Business and Enterprise College, a secondary school for boys in Southampton
Grove Park, Birmingham, a park

United States
Grove Park, Florida, an unincorporated community
Grove Park (Atlanta), a neighborhood of Atlanta, Georgia
Grove Park-Tilden Township, Minnesota
Grove Park Inn, a hotel in Asheville, North Carolina

Canada
Grove Park, Ontaria, an area of the town, Lake of Bays, Ontario

In Saint Kitts and Nevis
Elquemedo Willett Park, Charlestown, Nevis, known as Grove Park until 2010